VisualAp is a visual framework for building applications and emulate systems. VisualAp is cross-platform as it is a 100% Java application.

This application is able to perform audio processing, image processing, text and other process-driven emulation. VisualAp provides a visual framework based on lightweight visual components (proclets) that implements specific tasks.

Users can extend the capabilities of VisualAp via user-written proclets. Custom analysis and processing proclets can be developed using Eclipse.

Features 

The user can create an application/system by selecting the components from a toolbox, configuring the parameters (via the Javabeans framework), and connecting the components together in order to set up communication channels between the components.

From the application menu the user can:
 create, load and save a system
 check the correctness of the current system
 run process simulation of the current system

Inside the main window the user is able to:
 instantiate a component
 move a component
 edit parameters defining the behavior of the component
 connect/disconnect a component to another

Components 
The following visual components are included in version 1.1 of VisualAp:
 add echo effect
 delay audio stream
 split stereo audio in two mono audio streams
 filter an image: blur, invert, sharpen, edge
 transform an image: rotate, scale, shear, translate
 inspect type information
 record an audio stream from the microphone
 generate stereo audio stream from two mono audio input streams
 read a text file, audio file or image file
 play the incoming audio stream
 display input data
 generate an audio tone
 write data (text, audio stream, image) to a file

New components, based on 
Javabean conventions, can be created to enrich the current library, using a Java software development platform.

Dataflow programming 
The programming language used in VisualAp to describe a system is a dataflow programming language. Execution is determined by the structure of the graphical block diagram on which the programmer connects different components by drawing connectors. These connectors propagate variables and any component can execute as soon as all its input data become available. Internally the VisualAp programming language is based on XML.

VisualAp uses multi-thread execution whenever multiple components are ready for execution simultaneously.

See also 

 Visual framework

References

External links

VisualAp official website

Image processing software
Free audio software
Java (programming language) libraries
Java platform software
Free software programmed in Java (programming language)